Gary Gibson (born in 1965) is a science fiction author from Glasgow, Scotland.

Life 

After studying Sociology, History and Politics at the Glasgow Caledonian University, Gary Gibson worked as a "small press" comics magazine editor before following courses in desktop publishing and design and subsequently freelancing as a graphic designer.

After marrying Emma, Gibson relocated to Taiwan before moving back to Glasgow in 2010.

Writing 

Gary Gibson has been writing since the age of fourteen and has published eight novels to date, four of which linked to each other to form the "Shoal Sequence".

He is a member of the Glasgow Science Fiction Writers Circle.

Publishing history 
After publishing some short stories Gary Gibson saw his first novel, Angel Stations, released in 2004 by Tor, that was nominated in 2005 by the British Fantasy Society for the award for best novel of the year, which was eventually won by Stephen King with The Dark Tower VII: The Dark Tower.

He followed up the following year with Against Gravity, also nominated by the British Fantasy Society for the award for best novel of the year, won that year by Neil Gaiman's Anansi Boys.

In 2007 Gibson published Stealing Light, the first novel of the trilogy The Shoal Sequence. The series introduced the characters of Dakota Merrick, Lucas Corso and the alien Trader-in-Faecal-Matter-of-Animals, a fish-like member of the Shoal race, who rule all inhabited space through their exclusive knowledge of the secret of faster-than-light travel. The novels involve a discovery regarding the origins of this technology. Stealing Light was followed in 2009 by Nova War, in 2010 by Empire of Light, and in 2013 by Marauder.

In 2011 Gibson published Final Days, the first installment of "The Final Days" series. And in 2012 Gibson published The Thousand Emperors, the second book in "The Final Days" series

In 2014 Gibson published Extinction Game, the first installment of a new series.

Other activities 

Gary Gibson plays guitar. He also keeps a blog called White Screen of Despair and a profile on Twitter.

Bibliography 

Gibson has published the following novels:

 Angel Stations. London: Tor, 2004 (paper). 
 Against Gravity. London: Tor, 2005 (paper). 

The Shoal Sequence
 Stealing Light. London: Tor, 2007. 
 Nova War. London: Tor, 2009. 
 Empire of Light. London: Tor, 2010. 
 Marauder. London: Tor, 2013. 

The Final Days
 Final Days. London: Tor, 2011. 
 The Thousand Emperors. London: Tor, 2012. 

The Apocalypse Trilogy
 Extinction Game. London: Tor, 2014.
 Survival Game. London: Tor, 2016. 
 Doomsday Game. Glasgow: Gary Gibson, 2019. 

Other
 Scienceville and Other Lost Worlds. Brain in a Jar Books, 2018. 
 Ghost Frequencies. NewCon Press, 2018. 
 Devil's Road. Gary Gibson, 2020. 
 Echogenesis. Brain in a Jar Books, 2021.

External links
 Personal homepage
 REVIEW : Angel Stations
 REVIEW : Marauder
 Story behind The Shoal Sequence - Online Essay by Gary Gibson 
 Audio Interview with Gary Gibson about his career and writing

References 

1965 births
Living people
Members of the Glasgow Science Fiction Writers' Circle
Scottish science fiction writers
Alumni of Glasgow Caledonian University